Muneer (also spelled Moneer, Monir, Mounir, or Muneyr, meaning illuminating, lightsome, bright, luminous) is a masculine Arabic given name, it may refer to:

Given name
 Muneer Ahmad, American professor of law
 Munir Akram, Pakistan Ambassador to the United Nations from 2002 to 2008
 Munir al-Rayyes (1901-1992), was a prominent Syrian newspaper editor and writer
 Munir Awad, citizen of Sweden who has fallen under suspicion of an association with terrorism
 Muneer Ahmed Badini, Pakistani writer
 Munir Bashir, Assyrian musician
 Münir Ertegün, Turkish politician
 Muneer Fareed, American scholar
 Münir Göle (born 1961), Turkish photographer
 Münir Hüsrev Göle (1890–1955), Turkish politician
 Munir El Haddadi, Moroccan footballer
 Mounir El Hamdaoui, Dutch-Moroccan footballer
 Monir Hossain, Bangladeshi cricketer
 Munir Ahmad Khan, Pakistani nuclear engineer 
 Mounir Maasri, Lebanese actor
 Mounir El Motassadeq, Moroccan al-Qaeda member
 Mounir Mourad, Egyptian artist
 Munir Bin Naseer, citizen of Pakistan who was detained in Guantanamo Bay
 Munir Niazi, Urdu poet
 Monir Fakhri Abdel Nour, Egyptian politician
 Münir Özkul, Turkish cinema and theatre actor
 Munir Ahmad Rashid, Pakistani mathematician, and nuclear scientist
 Muneer Sait, Indian field hockey goalkeeper
 Münir Nurettin Selçuk, Turkish classical musician and tenor singer
 Munir Said Thalib, Indonesian activist
 Mounir Yemmouni, French middle distance runner
 Mounir Zeghdoud, Algerian footballer
 Munir Sarhadi (1931–1980), Pakistani instrumentalist and Sarinda-player

Surname
 Asim Munir, Pakistan Army general 
 Mazhar Munir, British television actor
 Mohamed Mounir, Egyptian singer 
 Muhammad Munir, Pakistani judge
 Qusay Munir, Iraqi footballer

See also
 Munira

Arabic-language surnames
Arabic masculine given names
Turkish masculine given names
Bosnian masculine given names